Bradina geminalis is a moth in the family Crambidae. It was described by Aristide Caradja in 1927. It is found in China and Japan.

References

Moths described in 1927
Bradina